Monocyclanthus is a monotypic genus of flowering plants in the family Annonaceae containing the single species Monocyclanthus vignei. It is native to Ghana and Liberia. It is a rare plant of the understory of wet evergreen forest habitat.

Monocyclanthus and Monocyclanthus vignei were first described in 1953 by Keay.

Description 
It is distinguished from plants in the genus, Uvaria, by the single whorl of petals being valvate, and from Isolona, by both the carpels and the petals being free. The flowers are cauliflorous, that is, they flower on the trunk (or major branches).

Threats
It is threatened by ecosystem conversion and degradation, from mining, quarrying, logging and wood-harvesting.

References

Annonaceae
Endangered plants
Flora of Ghana
Flora of Liberia
Monotypic magnoliid genera
Taxonomy articles created by Polbot
Taxa named by Ronald William John Keay